Sev Lewkowicz (born 15 February 1951, in London, England) is a musical composer, producer, arranger and keyboard player based in the United Kingdom. He has played and recorded with Mungo Jerry, Dennis Locorriere, Any Trouble, Tim Smit, Sarah Miles, Jeff Duff and Tony Clarke. He is the grandson of Polish Professor and renowned Krakow born paediatrician, Ksawery Franciszek Lewkowicz (1869-1958).

He has recorded and released four solo albums; No Such Thing As Silence (Centaur Discs 1997), Mariner (Centaur Discs 1998)  This Is Not the End (Lynchet Records 2006) and The War Poets (2018). He has also recorded CDs with Gracious! (Echo 1996) and House (Water Under the Bridge 1999) and (2011 2011) and Sarah Miles (1999).

During the Covid lockdown period in early 2020, he renewed his working relationship with Jeff Duff after 40 years, and they recorded a new album together, to be released under Jeff Duff's name in Australia.

In 2002, he won an edition of The Weakest Link.

In 2007, Lewkowicz toured the UK with Dennis Locorriere (ex Dr Hook singer) along with Clive Gregson. The tour gave Lewkowicz a gold disc, and a live DVD of the tour was released in the summer of 2007.

External links
 Official website

1951 births
Living people
English composers
English keyboardists
Musicians from London
Mungo Jerry members